Claudio Patricio Santis Torrejón (born 16 October 1992) is a Chilean professional footballer who currently plays for Guatemalan Primera División de Ascenso club Sacachispas.

Club career

In 2014, Santis was sent on loan to Chilean second division side San Antonio Unido.

In 2018, he signed for Cedar Stars Academy in the American lower leagues.

For the 2020 season, he signed for Bolivian top flight club Atlético Palmaflor after struggling with weight issues in Chile.

International career
Santis represented Chile at under-15 level in the 2007 South American Championship and Chile U20 in the 2011 South American Championship.

At senior level, he was a substitute in the friendly match against Ukraine on September 7, 2010.

References

External links
 
 Claudio Santis at playmakerstats.com (English version of ceroacero.es)

1992 births
Living people
People from San Antonio Province
Association football goalkeepers
Chilean footballers
Chile youth international footballers
Chile under-20 international footballers
Chile international footballers
Club Deportivo Universidad Católica footballers
Puerto Montt footballers
San Antonio Unido footballers
Deportes La Serena footballers
Deportes Colchagua footballers
Deportes Santa Cruz footballers
C.D. Palmaflor del Trópico players
Deportes Melipilla footballers
Chilean Primera División players
Primera B de Chile players
Segunda División Profesional de Chile players
Bolivian Primera División players
Primera División de Ascenso players
Chilean expatriate footballers
Chilean expatriate sportspeople in the United States
Expatriate soccer players in the United States
Chilean expatriate sportspeople in Bolivia
Expatriate footballers in Bolivia
Chilean expatriate sportspeople in Guatemala
Expatriate footballers in Guatemala
21st-century Chilean people